The 1986–87 network television schedule for the three major English language commercial broadcast networks in the United States. The schedule covers primetime hours from September 1986 through August 1987. The schedule is followed by a list per network of returning series, new series, and series cancelled after the 1985–86 season.

Although Fox debuted as a fourth network effort in October 1986, the network waited until April 1987 to commence offering prime time programming, effectively deferring its first Fall programming season until September 1987.

PBS, the Public Broadcasting Service, was in operation but the schedule was set by each local station.

New series are highlighted in bold.

All times are U.S. Eastern Time and Pacific Time (except for some live sports or events). Subtract one hour for Central, Mountain, Alaska and Hawaii-Aleutian times.

Each of the 30 highest-rated shows is listed with its rank and rating as determined by Nielsen Media Research.

Legend

Sunday

Monday

Tuesday

Wednesday

Thursday

Friday

Saturday

By network

ABC

Returning Series
20/20
The ABC Sunday Night Movie
The Colbys
The Disney Sunday Movie
Dynasty
Growing Pains
Hotel
MacGyver
Mr. Belvedere
Monday Night Baseball
Monday Night Football
Moonlighting
Perfect Strangers
Spenser: For Hire
Webster
Who's the Boss?

New Series
Animal Crack-Ups * +
The Charmings *
Dads *
The Ellen Burstyn Show
Gung Ho *
Harry *
Head of the Class
Heart of the City
Jack and Mike
Life with Lucy
Mariah
Max Headroom *
Ohara *
Our World
Sidekicks
Sledge Hammer!
Starman

Not returning from 1985–86:
Benson
Diff'rent Strokes
The Fall Guy
Hardcastle and McCormick
Hollywood Beat
The Insiders
Lady Blue
Life's Most Embarrassing Moments
Lime Street
The Love Boat
Our Family Honor
Ripley's Believe It or Not!
Shadow Chasers

+ Animal Crack-Ups had a short run in prime time before moving to Saturday mornings in the fall of 1987.

CBS

Returning Series
60 Minutes
Cagney & Lacey
CBS Sunday Movie
Dallas
The Equalizer
Falcon Crest
Kate & Allie
Knots Landing
Magnum, P.I.
The New Mike Hammer +
Murder, She Wrote
Newhart
Scarecrow and Mrs. King
Simon & Simon
The Twilight Zone
West 57th *

New Series
Better Days
The Cavanaughs *
CBS Summer Playhouse
Designing Women
Downtown
Hard Copy *
Houston Knights *
Kay O'Brien
My Sister Sam
Outlaws *
The Popcorn Kid *
Roxie *
Shell Game *
Spies *
Take Five *
Together We Stand/Nothing Is Easy
The Wizard

Not returning from 1985–86:
Airwolf
Bridges to Cross
Charlie & Co.
Crazy Like a Fox
Fast Times
Foley Square
George Burns Comedy Week
Hometown
Leo & Liz in Beverly Hills
Mary
Melba
Morningstar/Eveningstar
Stir Crazy
Tough Cookies
Trapper John, M.D.

+ This was a revival of the 1984-1985 series following star Stacy Keach's release from prison on drug charges.

Fox
21 Jump Street
Down and Out in Beverly Hills
Duet
Karen's Song
Married... with Children
Mr. President
The New Adventures of Beans Baxter
The Tracey Ullman Show
Werewolf

NBC

Returning Series
1986
227
The A-Team
Amazing Stories
Cheers
The Cosby Show
The Facts of Life
Family Ties
Gimme a Break!
The Golden Girls
Highway to Heaven
Hill Street Blues
Hunter
Me & Mrs. C *
Miami Vice
NBC Sunday Night Movie
NBC Monday Night at the Movies
Night Court
Remington Steele *
St. Elsewhere
Stingray *
Valerie
You Again?

New Series
ALF
Amen
The Bronx Zoo *
Crime Story
The Days and Nights of Molly Dodd *
Easy Street
L.A. Law
Matlock
Nothing in Common *
Our House
Rags to Riches *
Roomies *
Sweet Surrender *
The Tortellis *

Not returning from 1985–86:
Alfred Hitchcock Presents (Moved to USA Network)
All Is Forgiven
Blacke's Magic
Fathers and Sons
Hell Town
Knight Rider
The Last Precinct
Misfits of Science
Punky Brewster ^
Riptide
Silver Spoons ^
TV's Bloopers & Practical Jokes

Note: The * indicates that the program was introduced in midseason. An ^ indicates a show that continued in first-run syndication after the network cancelled it.

References

United States primetime network television schedules
1986 in American television
1987 in American television